Rimini is a 2022 drama film directed by Ulrich Seidl. It depicts Richie Bravo, a once-famous Austrian pop singer who has settled in Italy, as well as his estranged daughter and his retired father. Hans-Michael Rehberg plays the father, in his last film role. The film is the first in a diptych; the other film, Sparta, is about Richie's brother, Ewald. Rimini premiered at the 2022 Berlin International Film Festival.

Cast
 Michael Thomas as Richie Bravo
 Tessa Göttlicher as Tessa
 Hans-Michael Rehberg as Father
 Inge Maux as Emmi Fleck
 Claudia Martini as Annie
 Georg Friedrich as Ewald

Production
The character of Richie Bravo was written for Michael Thomas. Seidl conceived of the character after Thomas sang a Frank Sinatra song at a restaurant impromptu while shooting Import/Export (2007).

The film was shot in Austria, Italy, Romania, and Germany for a total of 85 days over the course of a year from March 2017. The shoot in Rimini was set to take place in November 2017, but was postponed until early 2018 because winter fog did not arrive as anticipated.

Seidl and Veronika Franz wrote the diptych originally as one film titled Wicked Games, with the two plotlines told in parallel, but they decided to split it into two films in the editing process. Seidl said, "the unifying element here is the search for happiness and the attempt to leave one's past behind. But it catches up with you, that is the bitter or perhaps liberating truth that the protagonists ultimately have to face."

Fritz Ostermayer and Herwig Zamernik wrote Richie Bravo's Schlager songs.

Release
Rimini premiered in official competition at the 72nd Berlin International Film Festival in February 2022. It also screened at the 2022 Diagonale, where it won the prizes for Best Feature Film and Best Costume Design.

Wicked Games: Rimini Sparta, a 205-minute film consisting of Rimini and Sparta edited together, premiered at the International Film Festival Rotterdam on 29 January 2023. It screened at the Filmarchiv Austria on 4 March 2023, and is scheduled to screen at the Diagonale on 25 March 2023.

Reception
 On Metacritic, the film has a weighted average score of 81 out of 100, based on six critics, indicating "universal acclaim".

Jessica Kiang of Variety called the film "an uncompromising, coldly provocative drama" and wrote that Thomas gives "such an astoundingly deep-dive performance it barely feels like performance at all".

Peter Bradshaw of The Guardian wrote that the film "is managed with unflinching conviction, a tremendous compositional sense and an amazing flair for discovering extraordinary locations", giving it four out of five stars.

References

External links
 

2022 films
2022 drama films
Austrian drama films
French drama films
German drama films
2020s German-language films
2020s Italian-language films
Films set in Austria
Films set in Emilia-Romagna
Films shot in Italy
Films shot in Romania
Films shot in Austria
Films shot in Germany
Films directed by Ulrich Seidl
2020s French films